Giray Bulak (born on 9 March 1958 in Trabzon, Turkey) is a Turkish football coach who was most recently the manager of Fatih Karagümrük.

Coaching history 
Giray Bulak has been coaching since 1983, In 1989, he worked at Ipswich Town for six months.

He then was coach of Zonguldakspor, Kardemir Karabükspor, Çaykur Rizespor, Vanspor, Elazığspor, Konyaspor, Trabzonspor, Antalyaspor, Denizlispor, Ankaraspor, Vestel Manisspor, and Çaykur Rizespor.

References

1958 births
Living people
Sportspeople from Trabzon
Turkish football managers
Süper Lig managers
Sakaryaspor managers
Trabzonspor managers
Fatih Karagümrük S.K. managers